Wellington was an electoral riding in Ontario, Canada. It existed in various incarnations and names throughout its existence. It started as Wellington North in 1867 but was abolished in 1879 after only three terms. It was re-established as Wellington Northeast in 1926 and then changed to Wellington North in 1934 which existed until 1955 when it became Wellington-Dufferin. The name was changed again in 1975 to become Wellington-Dufferin-Peel. In 1987 it underwent its final name change to Wellington until 1999 when it was abolished into Waterloo—Wellington before the 1999 election.

Members of Provincial Parliament

References

Former provincial electoral districts of Ontario